Castillo de Alcalá la Real (or  Fortaleza de La Mota) is a castle in Alcala la Real, in the province of Jaén, Spain. 
It dates to the 13th-14th century, although some elements of the structure are older.
The castle was declared a Bien de Interés Cultural monument in 1993.

References

 Cano Ávila, Pedro: Alcalá la Real en los autores musulmanes, Jaén 1990
 Cano Ávila, Pedro: Actividad y vida en la Alcalá árabe, II Estudios de Frontera, Jaén, 1998, págs., 157-177
 Cano Ávila, Pedro: Historia musulmana de Alcalá la Real, Alcalá la Real, historia de una ciudad fronteriza y abacial, Alcalá la Real, 1999, vol. I, págs., 315-357
 Eslava Galán, Juan: Los castillos de Jaén, Ediciones Osuna, Granada, 1999, 
 Olivares Barragán, Francisco. 'Castillos de la Provincia de Jaén. C.S.I.C. Jaén, 1992, 
 Valdecantos Dema, Rodrigo. Castillos de Jaén: Descubre el pasado de una tierra fronteriza, 
 VVAA: Los castillos a través de la historia - Jornadas Europeas de Patrimonio Histórico 1997. Consejería de Cultura de la Junta de Andalucía, Sevilla, 1997, 

Buildings and structures completed in the 13th century
Bien de Interés Cultural landmarks in the Province of Jaén (Spain)
Castles in Andalusia